Stenidea excavata is a species of beetle in the family Cerambycidae. It was described by Stephan von Breuning in 1942. It is known from Tanzania.

References

Endemic fauna of Tanzania
excavata
Beetles described in 1942